Belarus–NATO relations refers to relations between the Republic of Belarus and the NATO for the sake of security, realization of common interests under the individual partnership program, participation in the "Planning and Analysis Process".

The main coordinating body of the process of achieving the goals of the Belarus–NATO partnership is the Department of International Military Cooperation of the Ministry of Defense of Belarus.

Cooperation 
Belarus joined NATO's Partnership for Peace program in 1995.

1995 
Belarus first began cooperating with NATO in signing Partnership for Peace documents in 1995.

1997 
Belarus has participated in NATO's Individual Partnership Program since 1997 without joining NATO.
Belarus has not joined NATO because it is a member of the Collective Security Treaty Organization under the auspices of Russia, and the Security Treaties with NATO regulate the exchange of classified information affecting the interests of sovereign states.

1998 
Since 1998, Belarus has had its own diplomatic mission in NATO.

2004 
Belarus formally announced its accession to the NATO process on 19 January 2004, and in January 2006 Belarus and NATO approved the first package of partnership documents, containing 21 objectives (9 common objectives, 7 ground forces, 5 air forces) and an evaluation document. This completed Belarus' accession to NATO.

2006 
Tensions between NATO and Belarus peaked after the March 2006 presidential election in Belarus. Belarus began to move in the Russian direction of policy in order to build a unified union of the two states. Belarus's relations with EU and NATO member states have deteriorated. The European Union and the United States have banned members of the Belarusian government from entering their countries following an energy conflict with the Russian Federation in late 2006. Official Minsk has attempted to change foreign policy. But NATO contributed to Belarus' armaments elimination, which was successfully completed in December 2006: 700,000 weapons were destroyed. Which was an important step for Belarus to fulfill its obligations under the Ottawa Convention.

2008–2009 
NATO–Belarus relations were more cautious due to internationally recognized political prisoners, limiting working visits to the Prague Summit in May 2009 on the Eastern Partnership. A NATO senior official made his first high-level visit to Minsk in many years in December 2008. In 2009, a Belarusian Chief of Staff of the Belarusian Ministry of Defense took part in the NATO Security Forum. It was agreed to continue work between the relevant experts.

2010 
Belarus became a NATO partner among 22. This also applies to the modernization, restructuring of the Armed Forces of Belarus under the program of individual partnership with NATO, the NATO program with Belarus. Identify needs for reform and additional training of forces and resources allocated by partners to participate in the program. Belarus is also a member of the Planning and Analysis (IPA), which highlights ways to improve interoperability and develop appropriate opportunities to enhance Belarus' national defense. NATO provided expertise and advice on how to achieve this. Belarus has made an important contribution to strengthening international, regional and national security and stability in Europe. For example, Belarusian officers and officials continued to participate in courses from NATO countries and their partners in theoretical subjects such as:

 Arms control,
 Organization of air traffic,
 Civil planning,
 Medical service,
 International law in armed conflicts.

Regarding military cooperation, it is noted that relations are good, even if they were good during periods of political and diplomatic tension. A precondition for strengthening Belarus' cooperation with NATO is to achieve an appropriate level of trust that would allow the exchange of classified information through security agreements.

The 2010 NATO–Belarus Individual Partnership Program has already included around 100 practical actions for joint implementation in areas such as:

 Arms control,
 Medical training,
 Language learning
 Civil planning (including during nuclear disasters).

2012 
In July 2012 (extended in 2014), a new package of NATO and Belarus targets was approved (6 general, 8 land, 4 air). As part of the agreed objectives of Belarus' partnership with NATO, the declared personnel are regularly trained in Belarus. Which includes training and field meetings with a permanent and variable composition of the peacekeeping company of the 103rd Guards Separate Mobile Brigade, as well as training of Belarusian servicemen in English and the basics of peacekeeping at the Military Academy of the Republic of Belarus. To ensure interoperability between Partners and NATO for combat training, exercises, and operations in engagement with Allied forces. Representatives of the Armed Forces of Belarus receive theoretical training and practical training in specialized courses abroad (including during the NATO Multinational Peacekeeping Exercise).

To participate in the Partnership for Peace, Belarus has agreed on the strengths and means to:

 A peacekeeping company from Belarus in peacekeeping operations;
 Up to 15 Belarusian officers to serve in NATO's multinational headquarters;
 In relation to the IL-76MD military transport aircraft;
 7 physicians (surgeons and traumatologists);
 1 mobile hospital of the category "Role 1+" (for medical support of national deployed units);
 Multifunctional platoon;
 Groups of specialists for military-civil interaction.

2014–2015 
In 2014, after the Russian occupation of Crimea, a Belarusian delegation headed by the Head of the International Military Cooperation Department of the Belarusian Ministry of Defense paid a visit to NATO Headquarters in Brussels. Each country builds relations with NATO separately according to the "NATO + 1" formula. Belarus' partnership with NATO for 2014-2015 agreed within the framework of the Partnership for Peace planning and assessment process, and prospects for Belarus' cooperation with NATO.

In accordance with the diplomatic protocol, Belarusian diplomats have regular contacts with NATO representatives.

Ideology and propaganda 
After the protests in Belarus in 2020, the self-proclaimed President of Belarus, Alexander Lukashenko, has constantly intimidated the citizens of Belarus with the prospect of NATO invasion from Poland and Lithuania. After meeting with Vladimir Putin in May 2021, he stated that "in case of vigilance and intensification in NATO," Russian troops would be transferred to Belarus "within a day."

In turn, the NATO North Atlantic Council condemned Belarus' actions to forcibly land a Ryanair aircraft, as well as the arrest of Roman Protasevich and his girlfriend Sofia Sapega. The Council stressed that Protasevich's detention violated the principles of political dissent and freedom of the press. NATO Secretary-General Jens Stoltenberg also told a news conference ahead of a meeting of Allied foreign and defense ministers that NATO had decided to restrict Belarus' access to its headquarters in Brussels.

Belarus's foreign relations with NATO member states

  Albania
  Belgium
  Bulgaria
  Canada
  Croatia
  Czech Republic
  Denmark
  Estonia
  France
  Germany
  Greece
  Hungary
  Iceland
  Italy
  Latvia
  Lithuania
  Luxembourg
  Montenegro
  Netherlands
  North Macedonia
  Norway
  Poland
  Portugal
  Romania
  Slovakia
  Slovenia
  Spain
  Turkey
  United Kingdom
  United States

See also 
 Enlargement of NATO
 Georgia–NATO relations
 Russia–NATO relations
 Ukraine–NATO relations

References

External links 

 Беларусь может стать российским плацдармом против НАТО, Владислава Зацаринная, сайт "Masterforex-V" 
 Лукашенко: Беларусь не определяет НАТО как потенциального агрессора, 2014 г., сайт "БелаПАН" 
 Лукашенко: Беларусь отреагирует на усиление НАТО вблизи белорусских границ, "Интер-Смит" 
 Стенограмма интервью Министра иностранных дел Республики Беларусь В.Макея программе "Неделя" телеканала "СТВ", состоявшегося 25 июля 2014 г., официальный сайт Министерства иностранных дел Республики Беларусь 
 Беларусь обсудит партнерство с НАТО, 2014 г., сайт "Корреспондент" 
 Беларусь обсудит партнерство с НАТО, Информационное агентство ЛIГАБiзнесIнформ 
 Беларусь активно втягивают в НАТО, 2011 г., сайт "Newsland" 
 Беларусь — НАТО, Министерство обороны Республики Беларусь 
 Отношения НАТО с Беларусью, на официальном сайте НАТО 
 "Nato and Belarus — partnership, past tensions and future possibilities". Foreign Policy and Security Research Center. Retrieved 25 November 2010
 Делегация НАТО находится в Беларуси, 2014 г., "ЕвроБеларусь" 
 Беларусь готовится к сотрудничеству с НАТО, "Deutsche Welle" 
 Если Украина вступит в НАТО, в Беларуси появится солидный российский военный контингент 
 НАТО и Беларусь, "Беларусь Сегодня" 
 НАТО 
 БЕЛАРУСЬ — НАТО: ПЕРСПЕКТИВЫ НА БУДУЩЕЕ 
 Беларусь и НАТО обсудили в Брюсселе перспективы сотрудничества, Interfax.by 
 Беларусь выступила против вступления Украины в НАТО, ПРОНЕДРА 

 
Modern history of Belarus
Politics of Belarus
NATO relations